Yorktown Heights was the only solo album by Feeder frontman Grant Nicholas. The album was released on 11 August 2014 in the United Kingdom and recorded during 2013, being a year after Nicholas announced at Feeder's final show of 2012 at the Brixton Academy that the band would be taking a break. It was with the first airplay of "Soul Mates" on the BBC Radio 2 show The Dermot O'Leary Show on 31 May 2014, that Grant's solo career made its radio debut.

Track listing

Reception

Early reviews for the album have been positive, with Renowned For Sound giving it a 4/5, describing it as "a very introvert and self reflecting record" and calling it "a first solo effort he can be proud of." GigSlutz also gave the record a 4/5, commenting that "it continues to surprise and sounds fresh throughout" and concluding that "fans of Feeder and Grant Nicholas will not be disappointed."

Chart performance

References

2014 debut albums
Grant Nicholas albums